Irish Jam is a 2006 comedy film starring Eddie Griffin. The plot is centered on an African American who wins an Irish public house in a raffle, and has to save the village from the clutches of an evil landlord. Despite the bulk of the film being set in Ireland it was not filmed there, nor were the actors Irish, but English.

The film was poorly received in the UK. In its review of the DVD release, Empire called it a "worst possible Eddie Murphy knock-off" and questioned why would Ireland still have had an evil aristocratic English landlord in 2006.

Cast
Starring: 
 Eddie Griffin as Jimmy Winston "Da Jam"
 Anna Friel as Maureen Duffy
 Kevin R. McNally as Lord Hailstock
 Tom Georgeson as Father James Duffy
 Dudley Sutton as Pat Duffy
 Tallulah Pitt-Brown as Kathleen Duffy
 Tony Maudsley as Brian McNulty
 Roger Ashton-Griffiths as Tom Flannery
 Marion O'Dwyer as Donna
 Vass Anderson as Mr. Pettikreep
 Petey Pablo as Jimmy's street pot customer
 Mo'Nique as "Psycho"
 Angus Barnett as Milos O'Shea
 James Bradshaw as Malachy McNulty
 Ray Callaghan as Doc Murphy
 Christopher Dunne as Michael O'Malley
 Nevin Finegan as Sean McNulty
 Togo Igawa as Mr. Suzuki
 Cathy Murphy as Dora
 Justin Sharp as Mocking village youth

External links
 
 

2006 films
American comedy films
2006 comedy films
Films set in Ireland
Films about landlords
2000s English-language films
2000s American films